Mauricio Moreno (born 15 March 1977) is a Colombian swimmer. He competed in the men's 100 metre breaststroke event at the 1996 Summer Olympics.

References

1977 births
Living people
Colombian male swimmers
Olympic swimmers of Colombia
Swimmers at the 1996 Summer Olympics
Place of birth missing (living people)
Male breaststroke swimmers